Nothodissotis is a genus of flowering plants belonging to the family Melastomataceae.

Its native range is Western Central Tropical Africa.

Species:

Nothodissotis alenensis 
Nothodissotis barteri

References

Melastomataceae
Melastomataceae genera